In enzymology, an amino-acid racemase is an enzyme that catalyzes the chemical reaction

an L-amino acid  a D-amino acid

Hence, this enzyme has one substrate, L-amino acid, and one product, D-amino acid.

This enzyme belongs to the family of isomerases, specifically those racemases and epimerases acting on amino acids and derivatives.  The systematic name of this enzyme class is amino-acid racemase. This enzyme is also called L-amino acid racemase.  This enzyme participates in 4 metabolic pathways: glycine, serine and threonine metabolism, cysteine metabolism, D-glutamine and D-glutamate metabolism, and D-arginine and D-ornithine metabolism.  It employs one cofactor, pyridoxal phosphate.

Structural studies

References

 

EC 5.1.1
Pyridoxal phosphate enzymes
Enzymes of known structure